This is a list of the 300 members who were elected to the Hellenic Parliament in the January 2015 Greek legislative election. A new legislative election took place on 20 September 2015.

Composition

Changes from previous Parliament 
The new parliament, sworn in on 5 February 2015, presented a radical departure from the past, with 134 out of 300 MPs elected for the first time. The new parliament also boasts the record number of 68 women MPs. For the first time, there was provision of a civil, instead of religious, oath, with the majority of MPs preferring to take the civil oath. Sixteen former ministers and other veteran political figures, chiefly from New Democracy and PASOK, failed to get elected. The most prominent "casualty" is former Prime Minister and former PASOK chairman George Papandreou, making this the first parliament since 1923 without a representative of the Papandreou political dynasty. The only MP remaining to have served in the first Parliament of the Third Hellenic Republic in 1974 is New Democracy member for Piraeus B, Ioannis Tragakis, while the only member elected in the 1977 parliament is New Democracy chairman and outgoing Prime Minister, Antonis Samaras.

Members of Parliament 
Changes table below records all changes in party affiliation.

Changes 
 2 July 2015:  (Heraklion) leaves ANEL, then resigns from Parliament. His seat is taken by Grigoris Makaronas.
 13 July 2015: Nikos Chountis (Syriza, Athens B) resigns from Parliament in order to succeed Manolis Glezos in the European Parliament. His seat is taken by Giorgos Kyritsis.
21 August 2015: Panagiotis Lafazanis, Konstantinos Delimitros, Ioannis Zerdelis, Konstantinos-Iraklis Isychos, Ilias Ioannidis, Aglaia Kyritsi, Thomas Kotsias, Konstantinos Lapavitsas, Efstathios Leoutsakos, Athanasios Petrakos, Stefanos Samoilis, Athanasios Skoumas, Alexandra Tsanaka, Eleni Psarrea and  leave Syriza and form Popular Unity.

See also 
 January 2015 Greek legislative election
 First Cabinet of Alexis Tsipras and Cabinet of Vassiliki Thanou
 September 2015 Greek legislative election

Notes and references

Sources 
Ministry of Interior

2015 (02-08)
2015 in Greek politics